Leo O'Connor (born 1967) is an Irish retired hurler who played as left wing-forward for the Limerick senior team.

O'Connor made his first appearance for the team during the 1988-89 National League and became a regular member of the starting fifteen over the next seven seasons. During that time he won one Munster medal as a non-playing substitute. He ended up as an All-Ireland runner-up on one occasion.

At club level O'Connor is a one-time county club championship medalist with Kinnitty.
In retirement from playing, O'Connor became involved in team management. He has served as manager of the Mungret intermediate hurling team, the offaly under-17 hurling team and the Limerick under-21 hurling team.

Playing career

Club

O'Connor enjoyed some success during a three-decade long career with Claughaun.

In 1986 he was a member of the Claughaun senior hurling team that reached the championship decider. A 1-9 to 0-9 defeat of Adare gave O'Connor a Limerick Senior Hurling Championship medal.

It would be twenty years before O'Connor once again tasted success with Claughaun. Having started the season as a goalkeeper he was later deployed as an outfield player as the club reached the final of the intermediate championship. A 1-17 to 2-9 defeat of South Liberties gave O'Connor a county intermediate championship medal.

Inter-county

O'Connor first came to prominence on the inter-county scene as a member of the Limerick under-21 hurling team. In 1987 he missed out on the county's Munster final triumph over Cork, but was included on the starting fifteen for the subsequent All-Ireland final. A 2-15 to 3-6 defeat of Galway gave O'Connor an All-Ireland Under-21 Hurling Championship medal.

O'Connor made his senior debut for Limerick in a National Hurling League game against Offaly during the 1988-89 campaign. Later that season he made his championship debut when he came on as a substitute against Kerry.

After a number of seasons on and off the team, O'Connor became a more regular player during the 1993-94 league and championship seasons. In spite of missing Limerick's emphatic Munster final triumph over Clare, he came on as a substitute in the subsequent All-Ireland final. For much of that match it looked as if Limerick side were going to make history and claim the title as they had a five-point lead with as many minutes left.  Offaly suddenly sprang to life following a Johnny Dooley goal from a close-in free.  Following the puck-out Offaly worked the ball upfield and Pat O'Connor struck for a second goal. The Offaly forwards scored another five unanswered points in the time remaining to secure a 3-16 to 2-13 victory.

Managerial career

In retirement from playing, O'Connor became involved in team management and coaching at club and inter-county level. He enjoyed moderate success at club level when he guided Mungret to a semi-final in the intermediate championship.

In 2009 O'Connor was appointed manager of the Limerick under-21 hurling team. After little success in his first two seasons, Limerick reached the provincial decider in 2011. After an epic game with extra time, Limerick emerged victorious on a score line of 4-20 to 1-27.

References

 

1966 births
Living people
Claughaun hurlers
Limerick inter-county hurlers
Hurling goalkeepers
Hurling managers